Odagaon Raghunath Temple is a Hindu temple dedicated to Lord Rama in the town of Odagaon, Nayagarh district of Odisha in India.

The temple dates from the Middle Ages and is an important pilgrimage centre in Odisha. It is built in a typical Kalinga style of architecture and is topped by 3 golden kalashas.

An important festival occurs here on Rama Navami.

References

External links

interior design of Raghunath Temple
Cant_9938373266,,9337666268
Binod (panda)

Hindu temples in Nayagarh district
Rama temples